Atabek Khnkoyan (19 October 1870 – 8 October 1935) was an Armenian writer of prose and poetry, who wrote under the pen name Khnko Aper and specialized in children's literature.

Biography 
Khnkoyan was born in the village of Gharaboya in the Lori region, renamed Khnkoyan after him. He received his primary education in his birthplace and then in Alexandropol (current day Gyumri). Between 1890 and 1910 he taught in various Armenian schools in Transcaucasia.

Following the establishment  of the Soviet regime, he settled in Armenia, where he resumed his career as a writer and educator.

Khnko Aper wrote mainly children's literature: fables, legends, and lyric and narrative poems. His original writings and translation make a total of 120 books. (The peasant and the bear, 1909),  (The Lamb Thief, 1911, 1941, 1970),  (Mouse, the Intended Bridegroom to Be, 1912),  (Parables, 1917, 1930, 1937),  (The Yerevan Streetcar, 1934, 1936). Khnko Aper's use of various dialects and popular language add to the charm of his prose and poetry.
 
He died in Yerevan and was buried in the Komitas Pantheon in Yerevan.

See also 

 Khnko Aper Children's Library

References

External links

 
 http://www.worldcat.org/identities/lccn-n92-83076/

1870 births
1935 deaths
Burials at the Komitas Pantheon
Armenian children's writers
19th-century Armenian writers
20th-century Armenian writers
People from Lori Province